Agkistrocerus is a genus of horse flies in the family Tabanidae.

Species
Agkistrocerus aurantiacus (Bellardi, 1859)
Agkistrocerus finitimus (Stone, 1938)
Agkistrocerus megerlei (Wiedemann, 1828)

References

Tabanidae
Tabanoidea genera
Diptera of North America
Taxa named by Cornelius Becker Philip